Memecylon teitense is a species of plant in the family Melastomataceae. It is endemic to Kenya.

References

teitense
Vulnerable plants
Endemic flora of Kenya
Taxonomy articles created by Polbot